The Lobster War (also known as the Lobster Operation;) was a dispute over spiny lobsters that occurred from 1961 to 1963 between Brazil and France. However, the French maintained that "lobsters swim" and so they could be caught by any fishing vessel from any country. The dispute was resolved unilaterally by Brazil, which extended its territorial waters to a  zone and took in the disputed lobsters' bed.

Although the historical incident of coercive diplomacy may have taken place long before the drafting of the United Nations Convention on the Law of the Sea, the dispute ended with the signing of an agreement on 10 December 1964 that granted to 26 French ships the right to fish for a period no longer than five years if they delivered to Brazilian fishermen a certain amount of profit from their fishing activities in the so-called "designated areas."

Incident and dispute

In 1961, some groups of French fishermen who were operating very profitably off the coast of Mauritania decided to extend their search to the other side of the Atlantic Ocean. However, since local fishermen complained that large boats were coming from France to catch lobster off the state of Pernambuco, Brazilian Admiral Arnoldo Toscano ordered two corvettes to sail to the area of the French fishing boats. Seeing that the fishermen's claim was justifiable, the captain of the Brazilian vessel then demanded for the French boats to recede to deeper water and to leave the continental shelf to smaller Brazilian vessels. The situation became very tense once the French rejected that demand and radioed a message asking for the French government to send a destroyer to accompany the lobster boats, which prompted the Brazilian government to put its many ships on a state of alert.

The same day, Brazilian Foreign Minister Hermes Lima considered the French approach as an act of hostility: "The attitude of France is inadmissible, and our government will not retreat. The lobster will not be caught." He called a secret meeting with his assistants to review the latest developments in the lobster war against France. Meanwhile, French President Charles de Gaulle reacted to perceived Brazilian interference with the French fishing boats that were looking for lobsters off the Brazilian coast by dispatching on 21 February the 2750-ton  Tartu to watch over the fishing boats, but it decided to withdraw it to soothe tensions. The Brazilian President João Goulart then gave France 48 hours to withdraw all the French boats, but as they refused to leave the area, the Brazilian Navy apprehended the French vessel Cassiopée off of the Brazilian coast on 2 January 1962.
By April 1963, both nations were considering whether they should go to war over lobsters.

Tribunal acts

On the scientific thesis
On 6 July 1966, the Administrative Tribunal of Rennes summarized the French government's claims that lobsters are like fish and that since they swim about in the open sea, they could not be considered part of the continental shelf. Brazil claimed that lobsters are like oysters in that they cling to the bottom of the ocean and so were part of the continental shelf. Admiral Paulo Moreira da Silva, Brazil's Navy expert in the field of oceanography who had been sent to assist the diplomatic committee during the general discussions, argued that for Brazil to accept the French scientific thesis that a lobster would be considered a fish when it "leaps" on the seafloor, it would be required in the same way to accept the Brazilian premise that when a kangaroo "hops," it would be considered a bird.

On shipowner claims
It was also observed that the claims of Celton and Stephan, two of the shipowners who sought compensation from France for losses occurred during the January–March 1963 fishing season, had no right to any compensation at all once the French government could not be held responsible for the unsuccessful seizure because of the unilateral position by the Brazilian government.

Decisions of the Conseil d'État then dismissed the allegations that the French government had authorized the plaintiff shipowners to send their vessels to go fish for lobsters on high seas or to off the coast of Brazil. It stated that the licenses given to the plaintiffs accorded to the masters of the vessels and not to the shipowners. The derogation was decided to have authorized the masters to exercise full command of their vessels for fishing on high seas, not in a particular zone. There is no evidence that the French government had authorized such actions and so their claims were rejected.

See also
 
 Brazil–France relations
 Cod Wars
 Turbot War
 1993 Cherbourg incident

Notes

References

External links
 The lobsters of conflict in Portuguese

Wars involving Brazil
Wars involving France
Military history of Brazil
Military history of France
Brazil–France relations
Fishing conflicts
Conflicts in 1961
Conflicts in 1962
Conflicts in 1963
Battles and conflicts without fatalities
1961 in Brazil
1962 in Brazil
1963 in Brazil